Alys Mair Williams (born 1987) is a Welsh singer. She sings pop songs with folk and jazz influences and includes improvised riffs while singing.

Williams was born in St Asaph but grew up in Caernarfon.

Appearance on The Voice UK
Williams appeared on the first series of The Voice UK in April 2012 but didn't get through the 'blind auditions'. She returned the following year to prove that she could do better. That year, all four judges picked Williams and she then chose the singer Tom Jones as her mentor. Williams reached the quarter final of the competition in June 2013.

References

External links

1987 births
21st-century Welsh women singers
Living people
The Voice UK contestants
Welsh singer-songwriters
People from St Asaph